Goodwood is an electoral ward of Chichester District, West Sussex, England and returns one member to sit on Chichester District Council.

Following a district boundary review, Goodwood was created from the Boxgrove and Lavant wards in 2019.

Councillors

Election results

* Elected

References

External links
 Chichester District Council
 Election Maps

Wards of Chichester District